The UK Album Downloads Chart is a weekly music chart that ranks the most downloaded albums in the United Kingdom. During the 2000s, the chart was compiled by the Official Charts Company (OCC) on behalf of the British music industry, and was based solely on Sunday-to-Saturday sales of non-subscription music downloads from selected online stores. The most successful artist of the decade was the British band Snow Patrol, who spent eight weeks at number one with their albums Eyes Open and A Hundred Million Suns. The record label that spent the most weeks at number one was Island Records – with an artist roster that included Florence and the Machine, Amy Winehouse and Keane, Island spent 22 weeks at number one with nine different albums.

Before the advent of music downloads, only sales of physical formats—such as CD, vinyl and cassette tape—contributed towards positions on the UK music charts. The first chart to record sales of downloads was the UK Singles Downloads Chart, which was launched in September 2004 to list weekly sales of single downloads. Downloaded singles were growing considerably at this time, rising ten-fold in the first half of 2005 compared to the same period in 2004. As single downloads grew in popularity, so did album downloads – 1.8 million albums were downloaded in 2005; a further 825,000 were downloaded during the first three months of 2006.

As a result of this growth, on 9 April 2006 the OCC began to include download sales alongside physical sales when compiling the UK Albums Chart. That same day, the OCC also launched a dedicated weekly chart based solely on sales of album downloads in the UK. Approximately 64,000 albums were downloaded during the week of the chart's launch, of which just under 2,000 were of This New Day by the British band Embrace, the chart's first number one. By the end of 2006 nearly 2.8 million album downloads had been purchased, which comprised 1.8% of the total album sales. By the end of the decade over 25 million albums had been downloaded and the market comprised 12.5% of total album sales. Following Embrace, a further 99 artists topped the chart; fifteen did so with two albums. Including original soundtracks and compilations, a total of 121 albums reached number one during the 2000s. , the UK Album Download Chart continues to be published each week by the OCC.

Number-one albums

By artist

Twelve artists spent four or more weeks at the top of the UK Album Downloads Chart during the 2000s. The totals below include only credited performances, and do not include appearances on original soundtracks or compilation albums.

By record label
Nine record labels spent eight or more weeks at the top of the UK Album Downloads Chart during the 2000s.

Download sites
During the 2000s, the UK Album Downloads Chart was compiled by the OCC using data from the following music download websites:

7digital
Big Noise Music
Bleep
City 16
easyMusic
HMV
iTunes
KarmaDownload
Metacharge
MSN Music
The Music Engine Service
MyCokeMusic
Napster
OD2
Playlouder
Recordstore
Sonic Selector
Tesco
Tiscali Music
Virgin
Wanadoo
Wippit
Woolworths

See also
List of UK Compilation Chart number-one albums of the 2000s

Notes

References

External links
Official Album Downloads Chart Top 100 at the Official Charts Company

2000s in British music
United Kingdom Download Albums
Download